Rehan Sheikh is a Pakistani film and television actor, director, writer, film maker and producer. For his portrayal of Hafiz Ilyas in social drama Inkaar, he received critical praise and a nomination of Best Actor at Lux Style Awards.

Personal life
Sheikh was born in London to veteran journalist Aslam Sheikh (d. 2003), who served as director-general of the Associated Press of Pakistan and was also "among the pioneers of economic journalism in Pakistan", whose older brother was a film director and screenwriter. 

Sheikh's mother is a teacher and spent a life time in serving the education sector. He has two sisters, both Fulbright scholars.

Career
Sheikh started with a youth theater group in South London, having worked in Tamasha Theatre Company's Women of the Dust in 1992. 

While visiting Pakistan on holiday, he directed, wrote and acted in a theater performance in Rawalpindi, and after being spotted by Sarmad Sehbai he got his first TV role in PTV's Aaghosh in 1993, which eventually became a classic. He went on do a number of popular drama serials and also was the host of a popular travel show Travel Guide of Pakistan.

Some of his notable performances include Haseena Moin's PTV classic serial The Castle: Aik Umeed and the Hum TV play Sanjha, which earned him a nomination for best supporting actor at the 1st Hum Awards. His other major serials include Awazain, Bisat, Kiran Kahani, Dozukh, Maa, Nasal, and Mohlat.

Sheikh wrote, directed, acted and wrote some of the songs for the film Azad.

Filmography
 Manto (2015)
 Actor in Law (2016)
 Chupan Chupai (2017)
 Azad (2018)
 Driven (2017)

Television
 Akhri Barish
 Sanjha
 Pehchaan (Hum TV) 
 Aks (2011)
 Aaghosh
 Bisaat
 Nasal
 Mohlat
 The Castle: Aik Umeed
 Doordesh
 Sath sath Ya Alag Alag
 Kiran Kahani (remake)
 Aik Nayee Cinderella (cameo)
 Woh Chaar
 HIT
 Aik Larki Bheegi Bhaagi Si
 The Ghost
 Akbari Asghari (Hum TV)
 Rookhey Naina
 Dozukh
 Laa (Hum TV)
 Sadqay Tumhare (Hum TV)
 Fat Family (S TV)
 Jugnoo (Hum TV)
Preet na Kariyo (Hum TV )
 Udaari (Hum TV)
 Sammi (Hum TV)
 Toh Dil Ka Kia Hua (Hum TV)
 Pukaar (ARY Digital)
 Qurban (ARY Digital)
 Inkaar Shahrukh Ki Saliyan (Geo Entertainment)
 Mehar Posh (Geo Entertainment)
 Berukhi (ARY Digital)
 Be Adab (Hum TV)
 Meray Humnasheen (Geo Entertainment)

Awards and nominations
 Nominated as supporting actor at 1st Hum Awards
 Winner of "Best Actor" at the 2005 Kara Film Festival from an International jury
 Winner-Hum Award for Best Supporting Actor at 3rd Hum Awards for Sadqay Tumhare''
 Nominated for "Best Actor" at Lux Style Awards 2020

References

External links 

1979 births
Living people
Punjabi people
Pakistani television directors
Pakistani screenwriters
Pakistani male television actors
Male actors from Karachi
Alumni of the University of Surrey